Nasuh Pasha was an Ottoman statesman of Albanian origin. He was grand vizier of the Ottoman Empire from 5 August 1611 until 17 October 1614. He was from Gümülcine (modern Komotini) and was a damat to the Ottoman dynasty, as he married an Ottoman princess. He was executed for corruption by Ahmed I in 1614.

Biography 
Nasuh Paha born in  Gümülcine, he was an Ottoman politician of Albanian origin.

He went young to Istanbul and obtained minor assignments from the menagerie . Thanks to the support of his friend Mehmed Agha he quickly got up and was soon appointed voivod of the Qaḍāʾ of Zile , in Anatolia , and then governor of Fülek in Hungary. He married the daughter of Kurdish prince Mir Sheref becoming rich and powerful, which made him proud and cruel.

In 1602 he was appointed governor of Sivas , in 1603 of Aleppo and in 1606 of Diyarbekir . In 1606 he was appointed third vizier and serasker of the expedition to Persia, but before leaving he was sent to suppress the revolt in Anatolia ; for a betrayal by the Kurds he lost a battle and until 1608 he was unable to rejoin the army of the Grand Vizier Kuyucu Murad Pasha who received him coldly.

In 1610 he asked Sultan Ahmed I to be appointed grand vizier in exchange for 40,000 ducats and the expenses of the army, but the sultan communicated this to the grand vizier who requested such sums as a fine. But the Grand Vizier died shortly after (5 August 1611) at the age of 76 and Nasuh was appointed to the post. He married Ahmed I's daughter, Ayşe Sultan (1612). He has mercilessly repressed his real or imaginary adversaries. He was brave, eloquent and dynamic but at the same time irritable, violent and unable to speak in a low voice, always looking for the humiliation of others. He amassed enormous wealth and considered himself chosen to rule. The sultan decided to remove him and had him strangled by the chief of the Sultan's bodyguards, the Bostanji-bashi, on October 17, 1614. Nasuh Pasha's properties were confiscated.

See also 
 List of Ottoman Grand Viziers
 Treaty of Nasuh Pasha

References 

17th-century Grand Viziers of the Ottoman Empire
Albanian Grand Viziers of the Ottoman Empire
Executed people from the Ottoman Empire
Devshirme
People from Komotini
1614 deaths
17th-century executions by the Ottoman Empire
Executed Albanian people
Year of birth unknown
Damats